Robyn Alison Moore (born 4 November 1971) is an Australian actress.

Biography
Moore was born in Brisbane. Her first movie role was as an Officer in Locker Room in the zombie film Undead and earned her a role as Mrs. Della Costa in the 2006 Nine Network Australia series Mortified. She began her acting career in the drama short film The Big Picture which was directed by the Spierig brothers and had her first lead role in Australian Television series All Saints. In 2008 she portrayed June Turner in the series K-9 and appeared in the thriller film The Horseman. Her latest role was as Forensic Investigator Simms in Daybreakers.

Filmography

Film
 The Big Picture (short film) (2000) as Wendy
 Back (short film) (2002) as Meg
 Undead (2003) as Officer in Locker Room
 The Horseman (2008) as Irene
 Daybreakers (2009) as Forensic Investigator Simms
 Mabo (2012) as Barbara Hocking
 Huge (short film) (2012) as Liz
 Sliver Stiletto (short film) (2012) as Detective Morgan
 Bad Karma (2012) as Doctor Morris
 Undertow (2011) as Irene
 My Mistress (2014) as Fiona Pearce

Television
 All Saints (2001) as Deirdre Furrow (1 episode)
 Mortified (2006) as Primcipal Della Costa (3 episodes)
 K-9 (2009/10) as Jorjie’s Mother June Turner (24 episodes)
 The Gods of Wheat Street (miniseries) (2014) as June Makings (2 episodes)
 Secrets & Lies (miniseries) (2014) as Tech Officer (1 episode)

References

External links
 

1971 births
Living people
Actresses from Brisbane
Australian film actresses
Australian television actresses